The tribe Swartzieae is an early-branching monophyletic clade of the flowering plant subfamily Faboideae or Papilionaceae. Traditionally this tribe has been used as a wastebasket taxon to accommodate genera of Faboideae which exhibit actinomorphic, rather than zygomorphic floral symmetry and/or incompletely differentiated petals and free stamens.<ref name="Cardoso3">{{cite journal | author1 = Cardoso D|author2=Pennington RT|author3=de Queiroz LP|author4=Boatwright JS|author5=Van Wyk B-E|author6=Wojciechowskie MF|author7=Lavin M | year = 2013 | title = Reconstructing the deep-branching relationships of the papilionoid legumes | journal = S Afr J Bot | volume = 89 | pages = 58–75 | doi = 10.1016/j.sajb.2013.05.001 }}</ref> It was recently revised and most of its genera were redistributed to other tribes (Amburaneae, Baphieae, and Exostyleae). Under its new circumscription, this clade is consistently resolved in molecular phylogenies. Members of this tribe possess "non-papilionate swartzioid flowers[…]largely characterized by a tendency to lack petals combined with a profusion and elaboration of free stamens" and a "lack of unidirectional order in the initiation of the stamens". They also have "complete or near complete fusion of sepals resulting from intercalary growth early in development, relatively numerous stamens, and a single or no petal, with other petals not at all apparent in development." The tribe is predicted to have diverged from the other legume lineages 48.9±2.8 million years ago (in the Eocene).

Subclades and genera

Swartzioids sensu stricto Ireland et al. 2000
The members of this clade occur mainly in lowland rain forests.
 Bobgunnia J. H. Kirkbr. & Wiersema
 Bocoa Aubl.
 Candolleodendron R. S. Cowan
 Fairchildia Britton & Rose
 Swartzia Schreb.

Atelioids Ireland et al. 2000
The members of this clade are distinguished by "a nearly actinomorphic androecium with basifixed anthers, exarillate seeds, and a tendency toward alternate leaflets." They occur mainly in neotropical, seasonally-dry tropical woodlands.
 Ateleia (DC.) Benth.
 Cyathostegia (Benth.) Schery
 Trischidium'' Tul.

References 

 
Faboideae
Fabaceae tribes